The anterior corticospinal tract (also called the ventral corticospinal tract, "Bundle of Turck", medial corticospinal tract, direct pyramidal tract, or anterior cerebrospinal fasciculus) is a small bundle of descending fibers that connect the cerebral cortex to the spinal cord. Descending tracts are pathways by which motor signals are sent from upper motor neurons in the brain to lower motor neurons which then directly innervate muscle to produce movement. The anterior corticospinal tract is usually small, varying inversely in size with the lateral corticospinal tract, which is the main part of the corticospinal tract.

It lies close to the anterior median fissure, and is present only in the upper part of the spinal cord; gradually diminishing in size as it descends, it ends about the middle of the thoracic region.

It consists of descending fibers that arise from cells in the motor area of the ipsilateral cerebral hemisphere. The impulse travels from these upper motor neurons (located in the pre-central gyrus of the brain) through the anterior column. In contrast to the fibers for the lateral corticospinal tract, the fibers for the anterior corticospinal tract do not decussate at the level of the medulla oblongata, although they do cross over in the spinal level they innervate. They then synapse at the anterior horn with the lower motor neuron which then synapses with the target muscle at the motor end plate. In contrast to the lateral corticospinal tract which controls the movement of the limbs, the anterior corticospinal tract controls the movements of axial muscles (of the trunk).

A few of its fibers pass to the lateral column of the same side and to the gray matter at the base of the posterior grey column.

Additional images

References

 Saladin, Kenneth S. "The Spinal Cord, Spinal Nerves, and Somatic Reflexes." Anatomy & Physiology: The Unity of Form and Function. 6th ed. New York: McGraw-Hill, 2012. N. pag. Print.

External links
 
 Overview at thebrain.mcgill.ca
 http://teachmeanatomy.info/neuro/pathways/descending-tracts-motor/

Motor system
Spinal cord tracts